Diplomatic relations between the People's Republic of China and the Maldives were established in 1972. China has an embassy in Malé which opened in November 2011, and the Maldives has an embassy in Beijing which opened in 2009.

History
The relations between China and Maldives date back hundreds of years. A record from Tang Dynasty documents a visiting Maldivian delegation bearing gifts from King Baladitiya to Emperor Gaozong in 658 AD, and repeatedly in 662 AD. The Maldives are referred to as "Mo-lai". The Chinese explorer Zheng He visited the islands in 1412 and 1417 AD.

Maldives strongly supported China's 2007 application to join the South Asian Association for Regional Cooperation (SAARC) as an observer.

In July 2022, the Chinese embassy in the capital city Malé received a bomb threat, sent via the city's website, that also targeted a Russian consulate. Security forces were dispatched to the affected areas and the residence of politician Mohamed Nasheed, and some streets were cordoned off.

High level visits
In 1999, the People's Liberation Army chief of staff visited Malé, and Premier Zhu Rongji visited in 2001. In 2002, the Maldives Minister of Defense and National Security visited China. In 2010, President Mohamed Nasheed made a state visit to China. In May 2011, Wu Bangguo, the Chairman of Chinese National People's Congress and member of the Politburo Standing Committee of the Chinese Communist Party, visited the Maldives. In September 2012, President Mohammed Waheed Hassan met Prime Minister Wen Jiabao in China. In October 2012, Li Changchun, member of the Politburo Standing Committee, visited the Maldivian President Mohammed Waheed Hassan. Li said "China will continue to provide assistance to its capacity to help promote the Maldivian social and economic growth and support the country's infrastructure and human resource development". In December 2012, the Maldives Minister of Defense and National Security visited China. In September 2014, President Abdulla Yameen traveled to China and during the next month Xi Jinping, President and the General Secretary of the Chinese Communist Party, visited Maldivian President Abdulla Yameen. In August 2017 three Chinese navy warships made a port call to Male. In December 2017, in China, President Yameen signed a free trade agreement with China; notably this was the Maldives' first free trade agreement.

Debt trap allegations
Following the defeat of Abdulla Yameen in September 2018, the government of Ibrahim Mohamed Solih raised concerns about the level of Chinese debt incurred by Yameen's government. In December 2019, the Speaker of the People's Majlis and former president Mohamed Nasheed labelled debts incurred to build projects such as the Sinamalé Bridge, part of a debt trap. Former Maldivian officials and Chinese representatives criticized Nasheed's lack of detailed accounting, and worried that the amount was still a large amount for the islands.

Infrastructure cooperation 
Under President Mohamed Nasheed, Beijing financed a housing complex in Hulhumalé, "the largest civilian housing project in the history of the country and the first commercial project undertaken by the Chinese in the Maldives". The upgrade of Malé International Airport was awarded to China after the eviction of Indian contractors.

By 2014, Chinese investments in the Maldives included the Malé-Hulhule Bridge, a Maldives Ministry of Foreign Affairs building, a national museum, housing projects, and investments in sectors such as renewable energy, tourism, and telecommunications.

Tourism 
363,000 Chinese tourists visited Maldives in 2014. In 2018 and 2019 there was a gradual decrease in Chinese tourists.

Triangular relations

Impact on relations with India

Following growing Chinese influence in Maldives, India–Maldives relations had soured in a number of areas including defence and security. Successive Indian Governments expressed concern about the growing Chinese influence in the Maldives. China and the Maldives in 2018 were looking to construct a Joint Ocean Observation Station; the Government of India and the Maldivian Democratic Party expressed concerns that it will be used for military applications by China. Media reports later indicated that Maldives might cancel the plans.

Impact on relations with United States 

The US has a Maldives-focused assistance program within the United States Department of the Treasury to provide "assistance on debt strategy and domestic debt management".

References

External links 
 Embassy of China in Maldives
 Embassy of Maldives in China

 
Maldives
Bilateral relations of the Maldives